Will You Still Love Me? may refer to:

 "Will You Still Love Me?" (song), a 1986 song by Chicago
 Will You Still Love Me? (EP), a 1999 EP by Julie Doiron

See also
"Will You Love Me Tomorrow"